John David Hawkins is a trial lawyer from Spartanburg, South Carolina. He is the owner and managing attorney of the Hawkins Law Firm.

From 1996 through 2000 he served in the South Carolina House of Representatives. He served as Chairman of the Legislative Freshman Caucus.

In 2000 he was elected a Republican member of the South Carolina Senate, representing the 12th District. In 2004 he narrowly won re-election defeating his primary challenger, Lee Bright by 31 votes. In 2008 Hawkins did not run for re-election.

In 2012, Hawkins challenged Lee Bright in the Republican Primary for District 12 but was defeated.

While serving in the Senate, Hawkins was a leading proponent of South Carolina Amendment 1, prohibiting same-sex marriage, which was passed in a statewide referendum in 2006.  On September 18, 2013, Hawkins renounced this anti-gay legislation and announced, "I was wrong about  the marriage amendment.  I wish I hadn't been so strident against it." Formerly a Republican, he now considers himself a progressive independent.

References

External links
Project Vote Smart - Senator John D. Hawkins (SC) profile
2006 2004 2002 2000 19981996 campaign contributions

Republican Party South Carolina state senators
Republican Party members of the South Carolina House of Representatives
Politicians from Spartanburg, South Carolina
1968 births
Living people